Balestan may refer to:
 Balestan, East Azerbaijan
 Balestan, West Azerbaijan